Caller may refer to:

 Caller (telecommunications), a party that originates a call
 Caller (dancing), a person that calls dance figures in round dances and square dances
 Caller, the Catalan equivalent of Cagliari
 A software program or procedure that invokes a subroutine

See also
The Caller (disambiguation)
Call (disambiguation)
Calling (disambiguation)